Placerville is a census-designated place (CDP) and post office in and governed by San Miguel County, Colorado, United States. The Placerville post office has the ZIP Code 81430 (post office boxes). At the United States Census 2020, the population of the Placerville CDP was 362.

History
Placerville was originally established as a small mining camp, named after the placer gold mines located on the San Miguel River and Leopard Creek. The location became known as Old Placerville after the Rio Grande Southern Railroad constructed a depot and several passing sidings west of the original settlement, calling it Placerville.

A. B. Frenzel discovered vanadium-bearing sandstone near Placerville in the late 1890s.  The ore was in strataform bodies in the Entrada Sandstone (Jurassic) east of the town.  The principal mineral was roscoelite, with minor montroseite and carnotite.  By the fall of 1899, development was described as "of the most superficial character," although Frenzel had driven one tunnel 18 feet into the rock.  By 1901-1902, Frenzel was excavating several thousand tons intended for shipment to Europe.  Most of the Placerville ore was less than 3% vanadium, too low grade to pay for shipment to Europe, so in 1905 the Vanadium Alloys Co. built an ore-processing mill southeast of Placerville to recover the metal as ferro-vanadium, which it sold.  At least five mines were active at one time, and by 1919 the two ore mills at Placerville were producing 30% of the world's vanadium.  Through 1940, the mines produced about 3.7 million pounds of vanadium.

The Placerville Schoolhouse, a one-room schoolhouse, operated from 1908 to 1960.

In 1909, the failure of the Trout Lake Dam caused the flooding of Placerville as well as Sawpit and Newmire.
 
Although carnotite was recognized as a minor constituent of the ore since its discovery, the amount was small, and no assays were made of the uranium content of the ore until World War II.  Beginning about 1950, the small uranium content of the ore was also recovered from the ore.

Geography

Climate

According to the Köppen Climate Classification system, Placerville has a warm-summer humid continental climate, abbreviated "Dfb" on climate maps.

Demographics

Transportation
Placerville is part of Colorado's Bustang network. It is on the Durango-Grand Junction Outrider line.

See also

 List of census-designated places in Colorado

References

External links

 Placerville WesternMiningHistory.com
 Placerville Sangres.com
 Placerville NarrowGauge.org

Unincorporated communities in San Miguel County, Colorado
Unincorporated communities in Colorado
Census-designated places in Colorado